Pamela Zoline (or Pamela Lifton-Zoline; born 1941) is an American writer and painter, born in Chicago, living in the United States in Telluride, Colorado.

Background
Among science fiction fans, she is known for her controversial short story "The Heat Death of the Universe", published in 1967 in New Worlds. Although she went on to publish further stories in magazines including The New SF, Likely Stories, and Interzone, Zoline remains best known for "Heat Death", which has been frequently reprinted since its original publication. Zoline is admired for her experimental approach to both the form of the short story and the genre of science fiction, especially for using the language of science to interrogate the scientific world view. "Heat Death" is structured in a loosely encyclopedic style, with 54 numbered paragraphs narrated in a deliberately matter-of-fact third-person voice. It centers on a day in the life of middle-class housewife Sarah Boyle as she goes about preparing her children's breakfast and organizing a birthday party. Boyle's domestic sphere is presented as a possibly closed system analogous to the universe itself, and Boyle as subject to the ravages of literal and metaphorical entropy. As the narrative veers back and forth among scientific explanations, descriptions of household events, and philosophical speculation, the cumulative effect is of a mind and a culture on the verge of collapse.

Zoline has also written a children's book (Annika and the Wolves), libretti for two operas (Harry Houdini and the False and True Occult, The Forbidden Experiment), and original science fiction radio plays for the Telluride Science Fiction Project.

Zoline lived in the United Kingdom, especially London, for the first two decades of her life. She later moved to the United States, where in 1984 she co-founded the Telluride Institute with her husband John Lifton and others.

Works 
 The Heat Death of the Universe and Other Stories, 1988 (short story collection).
 Annika and the Wolves. Coffee House Press, 1985.

Notes

Further reading 
 Aldiss, Brian W. "Foreword" to "The Heat Death of the Universe". In Robert Silverberg (ed.), The Mirror of Infinity: A Critics' Anthology of Science Fiction. New York: Harper & Row, 1973, pp. 267–273.
 Merril, Judith (ed.), "P. A. Zoline . . ." In England Swings SF. Garden City, NY: Doubleday, 1968, pp. 329–330.
 Page, Alison. "'The Heat Death of the Universe' by Pamela Zoline: An Appreciation by Alison Page". On the Ellen Datlow/SCI FICTION Project blog.
  Hewitt, Elizabeth: "Generic Exhaustion and the 'Heat Death' of Science Fiction". SFS 64:3, 1994.
 "Zoline, Pamela A." In Curtis C. Smith (ed.), Twentieth-Century Science-Fiction Writers, New York: St. Martin's Press, 1981.

External links 
  (short story)
 Telluride Institute
  Photo of Pamela Zoline

1941 births
Living people
American expatriates in England
20th-century American painters
21st-century American painters
Writers from Chicago
21st-century American writers
21st-century American women writers
20th-century American women writers
American women painters
20th-century American women artists
21st-century American women artists